Dalmo Gaspar (19 October 1932 – 2 February 2015), simply known as Dalmo, was a Brazilian footballer who played as a left back.

Dalmo started his career at hometown club Paulista and joined Santos from Guarani in 1957. He was The scorer of the goal who gave Santos the 1963 Intercontinental Cup over Milan.

References

1932 births
2015 deaths
People from Jundiaí
Brazilian footballers
Association football defenders
Paulista Futebol Clube players
Guarani FC players
Santos FC players
Brazilian football managers
Esporte Clube Santo André managers
Esporte Clube Taubaté managers
Footballers from São Paulo (state)